Ignatówka, also Lozisht, was a Jewish shtetl (village) located in what is now western Ukraine but which used to be part of the Second Polish Republic before the Nazi-Soviet invasion of Poland in 1939. Ignatówka was bordering a Jewish shtetl in Zofjówka, located in the gmina Silno, powiat Łuck of the Wołyń Voivodeship, in prewar Poland. The two villages were part of a joint Jewish community of Trochenbrod and Lozisht.

Ignatówka (Lozisht) was founded in 1838, and had grown to approximately 1,200 inhabitants by the beginning of World War II. Of those, only a few survived. Most of the Jews of Ignatówka died in a single killing spree along with the Jews of neighbouring Zofjówka (Trochenbrod) in the hands of local collaborators, consisting mostly of the Ukrainian Auxiliary Police shooters who rounded up the prisoners in the presence of only a few German SS men. According to Virtual Shtetl over 5,000 Jews were massacred, including 3,500 from Zofiówka and 1,200 from Ignatówka, including some inhabitants of other nearby settlements. The village was destroyed and now only fields and a forest can be seen there.

References

  a book about the combined towns of Trochenbrod and Lozisht

The Holocaust in Ukraine
Einsatzgruppen
History of Volyn Oblast
Former populated places in Ukraine
Historic Jewish communities in Ukraine
Historic Jewish communities in Poland
Shtetls
Populated places established in 1838
Holocaust locations in Poland
Holocaust locations in Ukraine
Jewish communities destroyed in the Holocaust